Brandade is an emulsion of salt cod, olive oil, and usually potatoes. It is eaten in the winter with bread or potatoes. In French it is sometimes called brandade de morue and in Spanish it can be called brandada de bacalao ('morue' and 'bacalao' meaning salt cod). Brandade is a specialty of the Roussillon, Languedoc and Provence regions of Occitanie (in present-day France); and Catalonia, Balearic Islands and Valencia in Eastern Spain. Similar preparations are found in other Mediterranean countries such as Italy (baccalà mantecato), Portugal, the Greek Cyclades (brantada) and other regions of Spain (for example, atascaburras, which is done with salt cod, olive oil, potato and chestnut) where dried salt cod is also enjoyed.

The word "brandada", like paella, matelote and others, has no translation into any language. Cod in French is called morue and in Occitan merluça. In nineteenth-century France, Baron de Brisse wrote a daily recipe for the world in the newspaper La Liberté, and these recipes were collected in 1868. One of them explained how to season what he called cod brandade, but in modern French it is called cod brandade.

In Menorca (Balearic Islands, Spain) sometimes artichokes may be added. In Marseille and Toulon, crushed garlic is added to the dish. Potato is also added to brandade in France and Basque Country, but not in Catalonia. Neither cream nor milk are included in traditional recipes in Occitania or Spain.

The early versions of the recipe contained only cod and oil, but potatoes have long been added. The version with potatoes may be called brandade de morue parmentière, after Antoine-Augustin Parmentier.

References

External links

French cuisine
Catalan cuisine
Cuisine of Provence
Italian cuisine
Occitan cuisine
Greek cuisine
Spanish cuisine
Fish dishes